Scopula flavinsolata is a moth of the family Geometridae. It is found on Borneo. The habitat consists of lowland forests, particularly forests on limestone and adjacent alluvial forests.

The length of the forewings is 9–10 mm. Adults are tinged strongly yellow throughout.

References

Moths described in 1997
flavinsolata
Moths of Asia